Emil Szymon Młynarski (18 July 18705 April 1935) was a Polish conductor, violinist, composer, and pedagogue.

Life
Młynarski was born in Kibarty (Kybartai), Russian Empire, now in Lithuania. He studied violin with Leopold Auer and composition with Anatoly Lyadov and Nikolai Rimsky-Korsakov. He was the founding conductor of the Warsaw Philharmonic Orchestra and subsequently served as principal conductor of the Scottish Orchestra in Glasgow from 1910 to 1916. He conducted the premiere of Karol Szymanowski's opera King Roger.

He composed, among other things, a symphony dedicated to his homeland (Symphony in F major, Op. 14, Polonia), and two violin concertos (1897, 1917). The latter concerto, in D major, Op. 16, has been recorded by Konstanty Kulka and Nigel Kennedy.

Emil Młynarski died in Warsaw at age 64. His daughter Wanda married Wiktor Łabuński. His daughter Aniela (Nela, Nelly) married Mieczysław Munz and later Arthur Rubinstein. He is the grandfather of John Rubinstein and the great-grandfather of Michael Weston, both American actors. He is closely related to the famous Polish poet and singer Wojciech Młynarski (1941–2017) and his daughter Agata Młynarska (born 1965), a Polish celebrity TV journalist.

Among his students were Pyotr Stolyarsky (the teacher of David Oistrakh), Paul Kochanski, Alexander Zhitomirsky, Paul Kletzki, and Wiktor Łabuński.

Selected works

Sortable list of compositions categorized by genre, opus number, date of composition, titles, and scoring

See also
List of Poles

References

Profile by Malgorzata Kosinska, Polish Music Information Center

External links

 

 Scores by Emil Młynarski in digital library Polona

1870 births
1935 deaths
19th-century classical composers
20th-century classical composers
Academic staff of the Chopin University of Music
People from Kybartai
Polish male classical composers
Polish classical violinists
Polish conductors (music)
Polish Romantic composers
Russian classical violinists
Male classical violinists
Russian classical composers
Russian male classical composers
19th-century conductors (music)
20th-century Russian conductors (music)
Russian male conductors (music)
20th-century Russian male musicians